Albena Boytcheva Branzova-Dimitrova (Bulgarian: Албена Брънзова-Димитрова) (born July 17, 1971) is a former Bulgarian female basketball player.

External links
 
Profile at eurobasket.com

1971 births
Living people
Bulgarian women's basketball players
Centers (basketball)
FIU Panthers women's basketball players
New York Liberty draft picks
New York Liberty players
Sportspeople from Plovdiv